Gerald L. Klerman (1928 – April 3, 1992) was an American psychiatrist and researcher whose work included the development of interpersonal psychotherapy, a short-term treatment for depression. He was chief of the US national mental health agency from 1977 to 1980.

Early life and education 
Klerman was born in New York City. He graduated from Cornell University in 1950 and was a member of the Quill and Dagger society, and graduated from New York University School of Medicine in 1954. After a year-long medical internship at Bellevue Hospital Center in New York, he went on to complete his psychiatry residency at the Massachusetts Mental Health Center in Boston.

Career 
Klerman's expertise included depression, schizophrenia, and anxiety disorders. From 1966 to 1970 he was on faculty at Yale University where he also held the position of director of the university's mental health center. He subsequently worked at Harvard.

From 1977 to 1980, he was the head of the Alcohol, Drug Abuse and Mental Health Administration, appointed by President Jimmy Carter.

Klerman's second wife, Myrna Weissman, was his collaborator for his work in interpersonal psychotherapy. Following a long history of diabetes, Klerman died of kidney disease on April 3, 1992, in New York City.

Books authored 
 Interpersonal Psychotherapy of Depression (with Myrna M. Weissman, Bruce J. Rounsaville, and Eve S. Chevron), 1984.
 Contemporary Directions in Psychopathology: Toward the DSM-IV, 1986.

References 

American psychiatrists
1928 births
1992 deaths
20th-century American physicians
Cornell University alumni
Members of the National Academy of Medicine